The tyamko (ट्याम्को) or tyamako (ट्यामको) is a small Nepali kettle drum, a prominent member of the panche baja ensemble. The body of the instrument is made of soft wood, clay, copper or iron; the skin is cowhide. It is about 15cm in diameter and 15cm high, but this can vary as instruments are not standardized. It is carried on a strap around the neck, at the waist when standing, and played with two sticks.

See also
List of Nepali musical instruments

References

Drums of Nepal